Heshun Town is an ancient town in Tengchong City, located four kilometers southwest of the city centre in Yunnan, China. The town's ancient name is Yangwendun which was changed to Heshun and eventually the name it bears today. Heshun is well known for its quadrangle courtyards that have been built into the town's hills.

Attractions
 Xianhe is a wetland that has the characteristics of biodiversity.
 The memorial of Ai Siqi
 The group of ancient trees of Thousand-Hand Kwan-yin
 Laundry booth
 The bridge of double rainbow
 The pool of dragon
 Zhongtiansi
 Kuige
 The library of Heshun

References

Township-level divisions of Baoshan, Yunnan
Tengchong
Towns of Yunnan